Lorrha–Dorrha GAA is a Tipperary GAA club which is located in County Tipperary, Ireland. Both hurling and Gaelic football are played in the "North Tipperary" divisional competitions. The club is centred on the parish of "Lorrha & Dorrha". The club is most famous for Hurling Team of the Millennium goalkeeper Tony Reddin, who played with the club from 1947 to 1957. Ken Hogan, who is a former manager and goalkeeper of Tipperary GAA, also played with Lorrha as did the heroes of the 1971 All-Ireland Championship team, Liam King and Noel Lane. In more recent times, John Madden was the club's representative on the team which won All-Ireland honours in 1989 and 1991. Also notable is Patrick 'Bonner' Maher (2009–present) who is the only Lorrha player to win both All-Ireland and Munster Medals at Senior, Under-21 and Minor with Tipperary.

Honours

 Tipperary Intermediate Hurling Championship Winners: 1
2007, 2022
 North Tipperary Senior Hurling Championship: 8
1905, 1914, 1924, 1948, 1956, 1966, 1984, 1989
 North Tipperary Senior Football Championship: 1
1983
 North Tipperary Intermediate Hurling Championship: 2
 1946, 2007, 2022
 North Tipperary Intermediate Football Championship: 2
 1983, 1984
 Tipperary Junior A Hurling Championship: 1
 1946
 North Tipperary Junior A Hurling Championship: 4
 1917, 1961, 1966, 1987
 Tipperary Junior B Hurling Championship: 1
 2003
 North Tipperary Junior B Hurling Championship: 1
 2003
 Tipperary Junior A Football Championship: 1
 1971
 North Tipperary Junior A Football Championship: 3
 1966, 1968, 1975
 Tipperary Under-21 A Hurling Championship: 1
 1966 (with Knockshegowna)
 North Tipperary Under-21 A Hurling Championship: 2
 1965 (with Knockshegowna), 1966 (with Knockshegowna)
 North Tipperary Under-21 B Hurling Championship: 2
 1983, 2017
 Tipperary Minor B Hurling Championship 1
 2006
 North Tipperary Minor B Hurling Championship: 3
 1993, 2006, 2010
 Tipperary Minor C Hurling Championship 1 
 2000
 North Tipperary Minor C Hurling Championship: 1
 2000
 North Tipperary Minor B Football Championship 1
 2007
 North Tipperary Minor C Football Championship: 1
 2003

Notable players
 Mick Cronin
 Tom Duffy
 Christy Forde
 Brian Hogan
 Ken Hogan
 Liam King
 Noel Lane
 John McIntyre
 John Madden
 Patrick "Bonner" Maher
 Tony Reddin

References

External links
Official Lorrha–Dorrha GAA Club website
Tipperary GAA site
Tipperary GAA Roll of Honour 

Gaelic games clubs in County Tipperary
Hurling clubs in County Tipperary
Gaelic football clubs in County Tipperary
Lorrha